Culex biscaynensis is a species of mosquito in the genus Culex.

Distribution
Florida, United States

References

biscaynensis
Insects described in 1999
Diptera of North America
Natural history of Florida